Pseudomonas rhizosphaerae is a Gram-negative, strictly aerobic, non-spore-forming, motile, rod-shaped bacterium found in rhizospheric soil of grasses in Spain. The type strain is LMG 21640.

References

Further reading

External links
Type strain of Pseudomonas rhizosphaerae at BacDive -  the Bacterial Diversity Metadatabase

Pseudomonadales
Bacteria described in 2003